Burley Manor is a historic home located in Berlin, Worcester County, Maryland.  It is a Federal-style brick house built about 1832.

It was listed on the National Register of Historic Places in 1974.

References

External links

, including photo from 1988, at Maryland Historical Trust

Berlin, Maryland
Houses in Worcester County, Maryland
Houses on the National Register of Historic Places in Maryland
Federal architecture in Maryland
Houses completed in 1832
National Register of Historic Places in Worcester County, Maryland